The Embassy of Kyrgyzstan in London is the diplomatic mission of Kyrgyzstan in the United Kingdom. It lies on Crawford Street in Marylebone in the City of Westminster. The embassies of Angola, Sweden, and Switzerland are nearby.

Gallery

References

External links
Official site

Kyrgyzstan
Diplomatic missions of Kyrgyzstan
Kyrgyzstan–United Kingdom relations
Buildings and structures in the City of Westminster
Marylebone